Sir John Packard Goulter  (born 8 August 1941) is a New Zealand business leader based in Northland. He is chairman of the commercial arm of Ngāpuhi, Ngapuhi Asset Holding Company, and was knighted for services to business and the community.

Early life
Goulter was born in Auckland in 1941. He received his education at a number of primary schools (Manurewa, Parnell, Panmure, and Tamaki) and at Penrose High School. He married Judith Lorraine Ruddell in 1963, and the couple had three children. His wife died in 1981, and in 1983 he married Bronwen Iva Shepherd. He later married Elaine (Karen) Goulter.

Career
Goulter's career spans almost 50 years, including 15 years as the inaugural chief executive and then managing director of Auckland International Airport Limited. He has chaired the New Zealand Lotteries Commission and United Carriers Group in Whangarei. He is currently chair of the NZ Business and Parliament Trust, Paraparaumu Airport, the Reserve Bank, and a director of TVNZ.

Goulter started his management career in Taitokerau with Ceramco.

Goulter contested the mayoralty in the Far North District in the 2010 local elections. He came a close second to Wayne Brown.

Honours and awards
In 2003, Goulter was inducted into the New Zealand Business Hall of Fame. In the 2004 New Year Honours, he was appointed a Distinguished Companion of the New Zealand Order of Merit for services to business and the community. Following the restoration of titular honours by the New Zealand government to the New Zealand Royal Honours System, Goulter accepted re-designation as a Knight Companion in the 2009 Special Honours. He is a Fellow of the New Zealand Institute of Management.

References

1941 births
New Zealand businesspeople
Living people
Knights Companion of the New Zealand Order of Merit
People from the Northland Region
Businesspeople awarded knighthoods
New Zealand political candidates
People educated at One Tree Hill College